In the 2006–07 season of competitive football (soccer) in Cape Verde  It was the first season that the national cup competition took place, its first winner was Académica da Praia.

Diary of the season
September 25 - CS Marítimo do Porto Novo celebrated its 25th anniversary
The Cape Verdean Football Federation celebrated its 25th anniversary
November: Paulense celebrated its 25th anniversary
Sport Sal Rei Club won their 6th title  for Boa Vista
SC Morabeza won their 3rd title for Brava
Vulcânicos FC won their 6th title for Fogo
Académica da Calheta won their 1st title for Maio
Académico do Aeroporto won their 8th title for Sal
Scorpion Vermelho won their 1st title for Santiago North
Sporting Clube da Praia won their 3rd title for Santiago South
Rosariense won their 2nd title Santo Antão North
Sporting Clube do Porto Novo won their 2nd title for Santo Antão South
FC Ultramarina won their 7th title for São Nicolau
Académica do Mindelo won their 10th and recent title for São Vicente
May 12:
2007 Cape Verdean Football Championships began
Académico do Aeroporto defeated Sporting Porto Novo 8-0 and made it the highest scoring match for the season
May 30: The match between Académica Praia and Vulcânicos was rescheduled, Académica Praia won 1-0
May 31: The match between Morabeza and Sal Rei was rescheduled, Sal Rei won 3-1
June 9: Académica do Mindelo defeated Sal Rei 6-0 and made it the season's second highest scoring match
June 24: Regular season ends
June 30: Knockout stage begins
July 14: Championship finals begins
July 21 - Sporting Clube da Praia claimed their 6th national championship title
August 25, - the 2007 Cape Verdean Cup begins
August 30 - Group stage of the national cup begins
September 1 - Académica da Praia won their only national cup title

Final standings

Cape Verdean Football Championships

Académica do Mindelo and Académico do Aeroporto were first in each group along with two Praia based teams Sporting and Académica, second of each group.  Académica Mindelo had the most points numbering 13, second was Académico do Aeroporto with 11, two Praia based teams Sporting and Académica had ten each which was third.  Académica Mindelo scored the most with 16 goals followed by Sporting Praia with 11 and Académico do Aeroporto with 10.  In the semis, Sporting Praia advanced with 6 goals scored each they defeated Académico do Aeroporto with three goals and Académica do Mindelo who defeated Académica Praia with a 1-0 result each leg, both of the clubs are Académica de Coimbra affiliates.  In the finals, the first match ended in a scoreless draw, the final leg ended in a goal draw, Sporting Praia scored a goal at the last minute of stoppage time, being an away goal, Sporting Praia won their sixth championship match

Group A

Group B

Final Stages

Leading goalscorer: Kadú - 9 goals

Cape Verdean Cup

The second ever Cape Verdean Cup took place (their last was in 1982). It became one of the most recent nations to hold their own  Académica Praia won their first cup title after defeating Académica do Sal 3–1 in the final.

Participants
Spartak d'Aguadinha, winner of the Fogo Island Cup
Académica da Calheta, winner of the Maio Island Cup
Académica do Sal, winner of the Sal Island Cup
Académica da Praia, winner of the Santiago South Cup
Rosariense Clube, winner of the Santo Antão Cup
AJAT'SN, winner of the São Nicolau Cup
FC Derby, winner of the São Vicente Cup

Island or regional competitions

Regional Championships

Regional Cups

Regional Super Cups
The 2006 champion winner played with a 2006 cup winner (when a club won both, a second place club competed).

Regional Opening Tournaments

See also
2006 in Cape Verde
2007 in Cape Verde
Timeline of Cape Verdean football

References

 
 
2006 in association football
2007 in association football